Raphitoma pruinosa is a species of sea snail, a marine gastropod mollusk in the family Raphitomidae.

Description
The length of the shell attains 13 mm, its diameter 5½ mm.

The fusiform shell is elongated with impressed sutures. The high, pointed spire contains 7 whorls, of which two smooth whorls in the protoconch. The subsequent five whorls are convex, cancelled by numerous axial ribs and lamellar decurrent threads. The body whorl measures more than half the length of the shell. The aperture is suboval. The columella is straight. The open siphonal canal is rather long. The rounded outer lip is thickened and denticled inside. The sutural sinus is narrow and conspicuous. The ground color of the shell is a bright pale yellow with whitish spots.

Distribution
This marine species occurs in the Mediterranean Sea off Tunisia.

References

 Gofas, S.; Le Renard, J.; Bouchet, P. (2001). Mollusca. in: Costello, M.J. et al. (eds), European Register of Marine Species: a check-list of the marine species in Europe and a bibliography of guides to their identification. Patrimoines Naturels. 50: 180-213. 
 Giannuzzi-Savelli R., Pusateri F. & Bartolini S., 2018. A revision of the Mediterranean Raphitomidae (Gastropoda: Conoidea) 5: loss of planktotrophy and pairs of species, with the description of four new species. Bollettino Malacologico 54, Suppl. 11: 1-77

External links
 Pallary, P. (1904-1906). Addition à la faune malacologique du Golfe de Gabès. Journal de Conchyliologie. 52(3): 212-248, pl. 7
 
 Gastropods.com: Raphitoma pruinosa
 Biolib.cz: Raphitoma pruinosa
 Natural History Museum, Rotterdam: Raphitoma pruinosa

pruinosa
Gastropods described in 1906